Chal Newton Daniel, Jr. (August 31, 1921 – February 13, 1943) was an American football player. 

Daniel was born in El Paso, Texas, in 1921. He moved with his family to Longview, Texas, in 1932. He was a member of Longview High School's championship football team in 1937.

He played college football for the Texas Longhorns football team from 1939 to 1941. He was selected by the International News Service, the Sporting News, and the Central Press Association as a first-team guard on the 1941 All-America football team. 

Daniel was drafted by the Chicago Cardinals in the 1942 NFL Draft but instead enlisted in the United States Army Air Corps in February 1942 after the United States' entry into World War II. In February 1943, he was killed in the crash of a Vultee BT-13 Valiant trainer aircraft airplane eight miles north of New Braunfels, Texas.

References 

1921 births
1943 deaths
American football guards
Texas Longhorns football players
Players of American football from Texas
People from El Paso County, Texas
United States Army Air Forces personnel killed in World War II